Hajjiabad (also Romanized as Ḩājjīābād) is a village in Khurheh Rural District, in the Central District of Mahallat County, Markazi Province, Iran. At the 2006 census, its population was 54, in 18 families.

References 

Populated places in Mahallat County